Taha al-Liheibi is an Iraqi politician in the National Assembly of Iraq who is a member of the Iraqi Accordance Front.

On, April 12, 2007, he was reported killed along with fellow Sunni Mohammed Awad of the Iraqi National Dialogue Council. They were reportedly killed in the Green Zone at the convention centre canteen of the parliament building in Baghdad, Iraq. The reported death was caused by the 2007 Iraqi Parliament Bombing.   Later reports were confused  and the official death toll the next day was limited to Awad.

External links
Suicide bomber kills Iraqi MPs
US admits Green Zone is no longer safe 

Living people
Iraqi Sunni Muslims
Iraqi Accord Front politicians
Members of the Council of Representatives of Iraq
Year of birth missing (living people)